Veliko Tinje is a village in the Pohorje Hills in the Municipality of Slovenska Bistrica in northeastern Slovenia. The area is part of the traditional region of Styria. It is now included with the rest of the municipality in the Drava Statistical Region.

The local parish church is dedicated to Saints Peter and Paul and belongs to the Roman Catholic Archdiocese of Maribor. It is originally a Romanesque building with later adaptations.

References

External links
Veliko Tinje at Geopedia

Populated places in the Municipality of Slovenska Bistrica